The Oliver A. Wickes House is a historic house in Warwick, Rhode Island.  The two-story stone structure was built in 1855 in a vernacular Federal/Greek Revival transitional style.  The house is the only known period stone house in Warwick, and one of a very small number in the state.  It has a four-bay main facade with a recessed entry framed by sidelights and a transom window.

The house was listed on the National Register of Historic Places in 1983.

See also
National Register of Historic Places listings in Kent County, Rhode Island

References

Houses completed in 1855
Houses on the National Register of Historic Places in Rhode Island
Houses in Warwick, Rhode Island
National Register of Historic Places in Kent County, Rhode Island